Justice Ajai Lamba (born 21 September 1958) is an Indian Judge. He is former Chief Justice of Gauhati High Court and Judge of Allahabad High Court and Punjab and Haryana High Court.

References 

 

Indian judges
Living people
1958 births